Anastasia Vladimirovna Russkikh (born 20 May 1983) is an international badminton player from Gatchina, Russia. She entered her first tournament at age 9 in Sweden and finished in third place. She began playing professionally with her local Gatchina Badminton Club as well as a larger Danish club in Skaelskor, Denmark. In 2010, she played for the Vendsyssel Elite Badminton club. Russkikh is one of Russia's top badminton players, and is a high-ranking competitor in women's and mixed-doubles competitions. Together with her partner in women's doubles, Petya Nedelcheva from Bulgaria, she won the silver medal at the 2010 European Badminton Championships.

Achievements

European Championships
Women's doubles

European Junior Championships
Girls' doubles

Mixed doubles

BWF Superseries 
The BWF Superseries, launched on 14 December 2006 and implemented in 2007, is a series of elite badminton tournaments, sanctioned by Badminton World Federation (BWF). BWF Superseries has two level such as Superseries and Superseries Premier. A season of Superseries features twelve tournaments around the world, which introduced since 2011, with successful players invited to the Superseries Finals held at the year end.

Women's doubles

Mixed doubles

 BWF Superseries Finals tournament
 BWF Superseries Premier tournament
 BWF Superseries tournament

BWF Grand Prix 
The BWF Grand Prix has two levels: Grand Prix and Grand Prix Gold. It is a series of badminton tournaments, sanctioned by Badminton World Federation (BWF) since 2007. The World Badminton Grand Prix has been sanctioned by the International Badminton Federation since 1983.

Women's doubles

 BWF Grand Prix Gold tournament
 BWF Grand Prix tournament

BWF International Challenge/Series
Women's singles

Women's doubles

Mixed doubles

 BWF International Challenge tournament
 BWF International Series tournament
 BWF Future Series tournament

References

External links

 

1983 births
Living people
People from Gatchina
Russian female badminton players
Sportspeople from Leningrad Oblast
21st-century Russian women